Knell is a surname, and may refer to:

 Eric Knell (1903–1987), English Anglican Bishop
 Gary Knell (born 1954), American broadcast executive 
 Phil Knell (1865–1944), American baseball player
 William Knell (actor) (d 1587), Elizabethan English actor
 William Adolphus Knell (1801–1875), British maritime painter
 William Calcott Knell (1830–1880), British landscape painter

A knell is also the sound of a bell when being rung for a funeral:
 Death knell